Quitman may refer to:

Places in the United States
Quitman, Arkansas
Quitman, Georgia
Quitman, Louisiana
Quitman, Mississippi
Quitman, Missouri
Quitman, Texas
Quitman County, Georgia
Quitman County, Mississippi

Other uses
 Fort Quitman, a former fort on the Rio Grande in Texas
 John A. Quitman, Governor of Mississippi

See also
 Quitman High School (disambiguation)
 Quitman School District (disambiguation)